Fevang Fotballklubb is a Norwegian association football club from the outskirts of Sandefjord.

The club was established on 26 August 1966 in the small farmer village Fevang about 5 km outside of Sandefjord. The first team are currently playing in the Norwegian Fifth Division (sixth tier), after earning promotion from the Sixth Division in 2011. It played as high as the Third Division in 1997.

Fevang has produced some talents, most notably Geir Ludvig Fevang.
 
The club colours are black and white, in stripes similar to those of Juventus F.C.

Most appearances
 Andre Horntvedt - 300 appearances (as of 2005)
 John Horntvedt - 275 appearances
 Bjørn Einar Karlsen - 264 appearances

References

External links
 Official site

Football clubs in Norway
Association football clubs established in 1966
Sandefjord
Sport in Vestfold og Telemark
1966 establishments in Norway